The third season of the American television drama series House of Cards was commissioned on February 4, 2014. Netflix released the season in its entirety on February 27, 2015. The season was filmed from approximately June 12 through December 20, 2014.

The season was recognized with numerous award nominations. Kevin Spacey won the Screen Actors Guild Award for Outstanding Performance by a Male Actor in a Drama Series at the 22nd Screen Actors Guild Awards for his portrayal of Frank Underwood and Reg E. Cathey won the Primetime Emmy Award for Outstanding Guest Actor in a Drama Series at the 67th Primetime Creative Arts Emmy Awards for his portrayal of Freddy Hayes.

Production
On February 4, 2014, Netflix announced it had renewed House of Cards for a third season of undisclosed length. On December 1, 2014, Netflix announced that the third season would be available on February 27, 2015.  On February 11, 2015, 10 episodes from the third season became accidentally available on Netflix for approximately 25 minutes due to "a bug in the system"; however, they were quickly removed.

Filming
In February 2014, Kevin Spacey stated that the show would again film in the Baltimore metropolitan area. On July 3, the show was denied filming access to the Security Council chamber at the Headquarters of the United Nations by Russia through its representative Mikael Agasandyan despite encouragement from Secretary-General of the United Nations Ban Ki-Moon. Russia questioned the propriety of filming in the chambers and felt that the room should be kept available for normal uses.

For a third consecutive season, the show filmed episodes at the offices of The Baltimore Sun, which in prior seasons served as the setting for the fictional Washington Herald. Among the municipalities filmed in for the season were Havre de Grace, Maryland, and Aberdeen, Maryland. On August 9, filming of a fictional motorcade at the National Mall caused road closures on Pennsylvania Avenue, Constitution Avenue and Independence Avenue. On October 6, filming occurred at DAR Constitution Hall in Washington, D.C. Other D.C. filming occurred at George Washington University and the Franklin Delano Roosevelt Memorial.

The season finale was planned to be filmed in Northern New Mexico areas in and around Santa Fe and Las Vegas, New Mexico in December 2014. On December 20, 2014, creator Beau Willimon tweeted that principal photography for the season had completed that day.

Tax incentives
Netflix had received $26 million in tax benefits for the first two seasons, but was only offered a $4-million incentive for season three by Maryland Governor Martin O'Malley, which resulted in its delaying and threatening to move production. By March 2014, it was clear that the requested state tax incentives would not be approved by the Maryland Legislature. In response to Netflix's threat to move production if "sufficient tax incentives" were not provided, the Maryland House of Delegates threatened to use eminent domain power to purchase, condemn, or seize the production assets, equipment, and other property that remained in the state because the production had already been the beneficiary of tens of millions of dollars in tax benefits.  By April 6, 2014, the Maryland General Assembly considered various methods to avail the tax incentives. However, the April 7 state budget only included a total of $15 million in tax incentives for filming, leaving a $3.5-million shortfall for House of Cards, which production company Media Rights Capital said might force them to move production. Baltimore Sun longtime television critic David Zurawik felt that the $3.5 million would not keep House of Cards from returning to resume production. As of April 11, some predicted that no matter what happened the season three release date would be delayed. On April 25, a deal was reached to leave the 2015 fiscal year budget with the $3.5-million shortfall, but to allow the producers to collect the $11.5-million unallocated filming credit that remained in the previous year’s budget.

Casting
On May 19, 2014, a May 19–21 casting call was posted in the Baltimore Sun for an NSA Director as well as senators, reporters, military colonels, emergency room doctors and a few other roles with projected shooting availability: June 12 – July 15, 2014. On June 3, 2014, an announcement for a June 7 casting call for extras and day players was made. In August 2014, Nadezhda Tolokonnikova and Maria Alyokhina of the punk band Pussy Riot were confirmed to be in the cast for season 3. In October 2014, two recurring roles were cast; Kim Dickens in an unspecified role, and Jenna Stern as an ambassador at the United Nations. Elizabeth Norment, who played Frank's secretary Nancy Kaufberger, died on October 13.

Cast
 Kevin Spacey as Francis J. Underwood, the President of the United States
 Robin Wright as Claire Underwood, the United States Ambassador to the United Nations and First Lady of the United States
 Michael Kelly as Douglas "Doug" Stamper, Frank Underwood's Chief of Staff
 Elizabeth Marvel as Heather Dunbar, the United States Solicitor General who announces her candidacy for President of the United States.
 Mahershala Ali as Remy Danton, the White House Chief of Staff
 Derek Cecil as Seth Grayson, the White House Press Secretary / White House Communications Director
 Nathan Darrow as Edward Meechum, a United States Secret Service agent
 Molly Parker as Jacqueline "Jackie" Sharp, the House Deputy Minority Whip and a Democratic U.S. Representative from California
 Jimmi Simpson as Gavin Orsay, a computer hacker and FBI informant
 Paul Sparks as Thomas Yates, an author hired by Underwood to write a biography on him
 Kim Dickens as Kate Baldwin, a journalist and White House Correspondent for the Wall Street Telegraph
 Alexander Sokovikov as Alexi Moryakov, the Russian Ambassador to the United Nations
 Jayne Atkinson as Catherine Durant, the United States Secretary of State
 Lars Mikkelsen as Viktor Petrov, the President of the Russian Federation
 Kelly AuCoin as Gary Stamper, Doug Stamper's brother
 Benito Martinez as Hector Mendoza, the Senate Majority Leader and a Republican United States Senator from Arizona
 Larry Pine as Bob Birch, the House Minority Leader and a Democratic U.S. Representative from Michigan
 Reed Birney as Donald Blythe, the Vice President of the United States
 Jenna Stern as Eliana Caspi, the Israeli Ambassador to the United Nations
 Christina Bennett Lind as Sharon, Doug Stamper's physical therapist
 Rachel Brosnahan as Rachel Posner / Cassie Lockhart
 Reg E. Cathey as Frederick 'Freddy' Hayes
 Mozhan Marnò as Ayla Sayyad, a journalist for the Wall Street Telegraph
 Kate Lyn Sheil as Lisa Williams
 Eisa Davis as Cynthia Driscoll, Heather Dunbar's campaign manager
 Curtiss Cook as Terry Womack, the House Minority Whip
 Christian Camargo as Michael Corrigan, an LGBT rights activist
 John Doman as Bishop Charles Eddis
 Shawn Doyle as Alan Cooke, a cardiovascular surgeon and Jackie's boyfriend (and later, husband)
 Frank L. Ridley as Harlan Traub

Episodes

Reception

Critical response
The third season has received positive reviews from critics. On Metacritic, the season has a score of 76 out of 100, based on 24 critics, indicating "generally favorable reviews". On Rotten Tomatoes, the season has a rating of 73%, based on 56 reviews, with an average rating of 7.02/10. The site's consensus reads, "Season three introduces intriguing new political and personal elements to Frank Underwood's character, even if it feels like more of the same for some."

Accolades
For the 67th Primetime Emmy Awards, the series received nominations for Outstanding Drama Series, Kevin Spacey for Outstanding Lead Actor in a Drama Series, Robin Wright for Outstanding Lead Actress in a Drama Series, and Michael Kelly for Outstanding Supporting in a Drama Series. For the 67th Primetime Creative Arts Emmy Awards, Reg E. Cathey won for Outstanding Guest Actor in a Drama Series, Rachel Brosnahan was nominated for Outstanding Guest Actress in a Drama Series, and Jeff Beal won for Outstanding Music Composition for a Series.

For the 22nd Screen Actors Guild Awards, the cast was nominated for Best Drama Ensemble, Kevin Spacey won for Best Drama Actor, and Robin Wright was nominated for Best Drama Actress. For the 73rd Golden Globe Awards, Robin Wright was nominated for Best Drama Actress.

Home media
The third season was released on DVD and Blu-ray in region 1 on July 7, 2015, and in region 2 on June 29, 2015.

References

External links

House of Cards (American TV series) seasons
2015 American television seasons